Saramati is a peak rising above the surrounding peaks at the mountainous border of the Indian state of Nagaland and the Naga Self-Administered Zone of the Sagaing Region of Myanmar. It is located near the village of Thanamir in the Kiphire District of Nagaland.

Saramati is one of the ultra-prominent peaks of Southeast Asia. It forms a natural boundary between India and Myanmar.

See also
 List of mountains in Nagaland
 List of mountains in Burma
 List of Ultras of Southeast Asia

References

External links

Google Books, The Physical Geography of Southeast Asia

Sagaing Region
Mountains of Myanmar
Mountains of Nagaland
Highest points of Indian states and union territories
India–Myanmar border